Lorraine of the Lions is a 1925 American adventure film directed by Edward Sedgwick and written by Isadore Bernstein and Carl Krusada. The film stars Norman Kerry, Patsy Ruth Miller, Fred Humes, Doreen Turner, Harry Todd, and Philo McCullough. The film was released on October 11, 1925, by Universal Pictures.

Plot
As described in a film magazine reviews, after an unwanted marriage between his son and a circus animal trainer, a grandfather disowns both parents agrees to take in Lorraine, his granddaughter from overseas. Lorraine is a seven-year-old child when she is shipwrecked while in route to the United States and is rescued by Bimi, a gorilla. Bimi takes her to a desert isle where there are a group of lions and an elephant. The animals teach her and protect her. Her grandfather has employed Don Mackey, a crystal gazer, to use his psychic powers to determine where the child is. Don locates her after she has become a grown woman on the island, and the grandfather and he  go on an expedition to get her and her gorilla friend. They find her and they head back to San Francisco. During a storm Bimi becomes panic stricken, breaks from a cage where he has been confined and seizes Lorraine to make off with her. Don fears that the animal intends harm to her and shoots Bimi. Lorraine regrets the death of the beast. Don starts to leave from the place but is restrained by Lorraine, who loves him.

Cast

Preservation
Prints of Lorraine of the Lions are held by the UCLA Film and Television Archive, Cinémathèque québécoise in Montreal, and Library of Congress.

References

External links

Stills at silenthollywood.com

1925 films
1920s English-language films
American adventure films
1925 adventure films
Universal Pictures films
Films directed by Edward Sedgwick
American silent feature films
American black-and-white films
Silent adventure films
1920s American films